Sanmen is a town in Longsheng Various Nationalities Autonomous County, Guangxi, China.

Administrative division
As of 2016, the town is divided into thirteen villages and one community: 
 Sanmenjie Community
 Jiaoqi
 Datan
 Hongzhai
 Ankang
 Shuanglang
 Shuangjiang
 Jizhua
 Guping
 Tonglie
 Daluo
 Huaqiao
 Dadi
 Huaping

History
In the Qing dynasty (1644–1911), it belonged to Xituan.

In early Republic of China, it came under the jurisdiction of the West District. Sanmen Township was formed in 1933. In 1947 it was under the jurisdiction of Guangfu Township.

After the establishment of the Communist State, it was renamed many times. In December 1994 it was upgraded to a town.

On June 6, 2019, the villages of Daluo and Tonglie was listed among the fifth group of "List of Traditional Villages in China" by the State Council of China.

Geography
The town is located in southwestern Longsheng Various Nationalities Autonomous County. The town shares a border with Sanjiang Dong Autonomous County to the west, Lingui District and Piaoli Town to the east, Piaoli Town and Longsheng Town to the north, and Yongfu County and Rong'an County to the south.

The Sanmen River flows through the town.

Economy
The region is rich in soapstone.

Tourist attractions
The Huaping National Nature Reserve is located in the town.

References

Bibliography

Towns of Guilin